The Third Option was a proposal from Canadian Secretary of State for External Affairs Minister Mitchell Sharp in 1972 which would have reduced trade and cultural relations between Canada and the United States and allowed for more diversification of bilateral agreements.

Sharp's proposal was a clear rejection of the "status quo" and of closer relations with the United States. The proposal would have been achieved by "develop(ing) and strengthen(ing) the Canadian economy and other aspects of its national life and in the process reduce the present Canadian vulnerability."  However, the Third Option proposal eventually disappeared as the Mulroney Ministry took over.

Related links 
 American-Canadian relations
 Brain drain

External links
 "Third Option". The Canadian Encyclopedia

1972 in Canada
Canada–United States relations
1972 in international relations